Culex asteliae is a species of mosquito from the Culicidae family that is endemic to New Zealand.

References

asteliae
Insects described in 1968
Endemic fauna of New Zealand
Endemic insects of New Zealand